Hemicycliophoridae is a family of nematodes belonging to the order Rhabditida.

Genera:
 Aulosphora Siddiqi, 1980
 Caloosia Siddiqi & Goodey, 1963
 Colbranium Andrassy, 1979
 Hemicaloosia Ray & Das, 1978
 Hemicycliophora de Man, 1921
 Loofia Siddiqi, 1980

References

Nematodes